Valérie Benguigui (8 July 1961 – 2 September 2013) was a French actress and theater director. Born in Oran, Algeria, she took acting courses at the Cours Florent and the National Chaillot Theatre School. Her first film role was in Francis Huster's On a volé Charlie Spencer (1986).

Her most successful television role was in the series Avocats et associés, in which she appeared from 2000 to 2005. She also produced and directed several plays at this time. In 2012, she portrayed Élisabeth in the film What's in a Name? (Le Prénom), which earned her a César Award for Best Supporting Actress, as well as a Molière Award nomination for Best Supporting Actress.

Personal life
Benguigui was married to actor and restaurant manager Eric Wapler, whom she met while studying at Cours Florent. They had two children.

Death
Benguigui died from breast cancer, aged 52, on 2 September 2013 in Paris. She battled the disease for three years. Benguigui was buried at Montparnasse Cemetery.

Theater

Filmography

References

External links

 

1961 births
2013 deaths
Actresses from Paris
French film actresses
Best Supporting Actress César Award winners
French television actresses
Deaths from cancer in France
Deaths from breast cancer
20th-century French actresses
21st-century French actresses
Burials at Montparnasse Cemetery
Cours Florent alumni
Pieds-Noirs